Michael Paul Koplove (born August 30, 1976) is an American professional baseball scout and former player. He pitched for the Arizona Diamondbacks and the Cleveland Indians.

A sidearm relief pitcher, Koplove threw with a different arm angle than most pitchers. His arm angle was perpendicular to his body, which allowed his fastball to sink and his curveball and slider to stay on the same plane, making it appear to be a fastball. He won a bronze medal with Team USA in the 2008 Olympics.

Early life

Koplove was born in Philadelphia, Pennsylvania. He is the son of Steve (an attorney) and Lorraine Milito, and is half Jewish and half Christian. He is the older brother of Joey Criniti and minor league and Team Israel pitcher Kenny Koplove, who is 17 years younger. He also has three sisters; named Andrea and Erica and Franca.

Koplove grew up in South Philadelphia and attended Chestnut Hill Academy in Philadelphia (where he was a first-team Philadelphia Daily News All-City selection as a senior) from which he graduated in 1995. After high school Koplove first attended Northwestern University for two years where he played shortstop and pitched, before transferring to the University of Delaware prior to his junior year.  During his junior season at the University of Delaware, he helped lead the team to the 1998 America East Championship and the NCAA Atlantic II Regional. He was voted an Academic All American.  He was drafted by the Arizona Diamondbacks in the 29th round of the 1998 Major League Baseball Draft.

Playing career

Arizona Diamondbacks (2001–06)
He played for the Diamondbacks 2001 World Series championship team, for which he was 0–1 with a 3.60 ERA, but was not on the World Series roster.

In , Koplove was 6–1 with a 3.36 ERA in 55 games, giving up only 47 hits in 61.2 innings (holding batters to a .213 batting average and a .276 slugging percentage; with men on base he was even stingier – .207/.228). In games that were late and close, he held batters to a .188 batting average. He was named the Diamondbacks 2002 Rookie of the Year.

In , Koplove was 3–0 with a 2.14 ERA in 31 games. With runners in scoring position, he held batters to a .100 batting average, and a .133 slugging percentage, and he held the first batters he faced to a .074 batting average. He had surgery for a frayed labrum and rotator cuff.

In 2004, Koplove set career highs in appearances (76), innings pitched (86.2), strikeouts (55), and saves (2), but his ERA was at 4.05. He was awarded the Diamondbacks 2004 Good Guy Award.

In 2005, his struggles continued as his ERA ballooned even higher (5.07) in 44 appearances.

He only appeared in two games in the 2006 season. He spent the majority of the year in AAA, where he had a 5–0 record in 48 games.

In 6 seasons with the Diamondbacks (2001–06), he made 217 relief appearances (3rd in team history as of May 2007), compiling a 15–7 record with 2 saves and a 3.76 ERA.

Florida Marlins organization (2007)
In January 2007, the Florida Marlins extended a spring training invitation to Koplove, who signed a minor league contract with the ballclub, but in March 2007 they released him.

Cleveland Indians (2007)
In March 2007, the Cleveland Indians agreed to terms with Koplove on a minor league contract. On May 23, the team called him up from the Triple-A Buffalo Bisons. He was 2–0 with 3 saves and a 1.00 ERA in 17 relief appearances (18 innings, 15 hits, 2 earned runs, 8 walks, 14 strikeouts). He limited batters to a .224 average and a .111 average with runners in scoring position.

Eight days later, the team optioned Koplove to the Bisons. Koplove appeared in three games after being called up. He allowed two earned runs in four innings for a 4.50 ERA. In , with the Buffalo Bisons he was 4–2 with 14 saves and a 2.50 ERA in 51 relief appearances.

Los Angeles Dodgers organization (2008)
After becoming a minor league free agent following the conclusion of the 2007 season, Koplove signed a minor league contract with an invitation to spring training with the Los Angeles Dodgers on December 12, 2007. He pitched the entire year for the Dodgers Triple-A affiliate, the Las Vegas 51s.

Olympics (2008)
In , he was named to the United States national baseball team for the 2008 Olympics in Beijing. Koplove played for the 2008 US Olympic team, earning a bronze medal with the club in Beijing, China. He was the only American pitcher not to give up a hit; he pitched  innings in four appearances, and struck out six.

Philadelphia Phillies organization (2009)
Koplove was signed by the Philadelphia Phillies to a minor league contract after the 2008 season, and was invited to spring training as a non-roster invitee.  After spring training, however, he was sent to the Lehigh Valley IronPigs in the International League. His contract called for him to be paid $16,000 per month in the minors, as opposed to $550,000 if he made it to the big league team.  On June 1, 2009, Koplove exercised a clause in his contract that stated if he was not on the major league roster by June 1, he would be granted his outright release.

Pittsburgh Pirates organization (2009)
On June 6, 2009, Koplove signed a minor league deal with the Pittsburgh Pirates, and was assigned to the Indianapolis Indians, also in the International League.

Seattle Mariners organization (2009–10)
On August 4, 2009, the Pirates traded Koplove to the Seattle Mariners for minor league shortstop Deybis Benitez. He was granted free agency in November 2009.

On December 22, 2009, Koplove signed a minor league contract with the Seattle Mariners. On July 1, 2010, Koplove was released by Seattle.

San Diego Padres organization (2010–11)
The Padres signed Koplove in August 2010, and re-signed him in February 2011. However, he didn't make the spring training roster and was cut in March 2011.

Camden Riversharks (2011)
He signed with Camden Riversharks of the Indy league in April 2011. He filed for free agency hoping to sign on to a new team.

Scouting career
Koplove worked for six seasons on the scouting staff of the Anaheim Angels. He then joined the Philadelphia Phillies as a special assignment scout before the 2018 season.

In the fall of 2019 the Philadelphia Phillies interviewed Koplove for the position of scouting director.

Hall of Fame
In 2019 he was inducted into the Philadelphia Jewish Sports Hall of Fame.

References

External links

Mike Koplove at Baseball Almanac
"Warming up for the Jewish Boys of Summer," 3/5/08
USA Baseball web site

1976 births
Living people
American people of Russian descent
Arizona Diamondbacks players
Arizona League Diamondbacks players
Baseball players at the 2008 Summer Olympics
Baseball players from Philadelphia
Buffalo Bisons (minor league) players
Camden Riversharks players
Chestnut Hill Academy alumni
Cleveland Indians players
Delaware Fightin' Blue Hens baseball players
El Paso Diablos players
High Desert Mavericks players
Indianapolis Indians players
Jewish American baseball players
Jewish Major League Baseball players
Las Vegas 51s players
Lehigh Valley IronPigs players
Lethbridge Black Diamonds players
Los Angeles Angels of Anaheim scouts
Major League Baseball pitchers
Medalists at the 2008 Summer Olympics
Northwestern Wildcats baseball players
Olympic bronze medalists for the United States in baseball
Portland Beavers players
South Bend Silver Hawks players
Tacoma Rainiers players
Tucson Sidewinders players
21st-century American Jews